Liu Libin (born February 16, 1995, in Beijing) is a male Chinese volleyball player. He is the first volleyballer who joined a foreign club as a current player of China men's national volleyball team. He currently plays in Beijing BAIC Motor.

Career

Club career
In 2013, Liu Libin got the champion of the junior event of volleyball in 2013 National Games of China with Jiang Chuan and Zhang Binglong as the main three wing spikers. In 2013–2014 Chinese Volleyball League, he made his debut and got the first champion of the senior event. After several seasons, he became the main OH of Beijing Baic Motor.

In order to improve himself, he decided to join a foreign club and chose Tourcoing Lille Métropole Volley-Ball in 2017. Although he was always the substitute OH of Ukrainian OH, Oleksiy Klyamar, he also helped the club much.

In 2018, Liu joined JT Thunders in 2018–19 V.League Division 1 Men's as the foreign player of AVC with his former clubmate, Thomas Edgar in Season 15/16 in Beijing Baic Motor. He was the main OH because he was good at the spike at Site 6, the block of the Euroamercian OP and the better serve.

International career
As a young player, Liu Libin participated in 2015 Asian Men's U23 Volleyball Championship as his earliest International tournament. Later, due to injured Zhu Zhiyuan, Liu Libin participated in 2015 FIVB Volleyball Men's U21 World Championship as the main OH and got the third place beyond the expectations of the Chinese U21 men's volleyball team. His International debut of the senior event is 2016 AVC Cup. Jiang Chuan and he played perfect and both got the best. Although he injured for many times, he just took part in 2017 FIVB Volleyball World League, 2018 FIVB Volleyball Men's Nations League and 2018 FIVB Volleyball Men's World Championship.

Awards

Individual
 2016 Asian Men's Volleyball Cup "Best Outside Spiker"

Clubs
 2013 National Games of China -  Champion, with Beijing Junior
 2013–2014 Chinese Volleyball League -  Champion, with Beijing
 2014–2015 Chinese Volleyball League -  Bronze medal, with Beijing
 2015–2016 Chinese Volleyball League -  Runner-Up, with Beijing
 2016–2017 Chinese Volleyball League -  Runner-Up, with Beijing
 2017 National Games of China -  Runner-Up, with Beijing
 2017–2018 French Cup -  Champion, with Tourcoing
 2018 Emperor's Cup -  Champion, with JT Thunders
 2018–19 V.League Division 1 -  Runner-Up, with JT Thunders

See also
Profile in 2017 World League
Profile in French Volleyball League 2017-2018 
Profile in Japanese Volleyball League 2018-2019

References

1995 births
Living people
Volleyball players from Beijing
Chinese men's volleyball players